Nazarabad, also known as Naz̧arābād-e Bozorg and Naz̧arābād-e Moghadam) is a city in the Central District of Nazarabad County, Alborz province, Iran, and serves as the capital of the county. At the 2006 National Census, the population of the city was 97,684 in 24,583 households. The last census of 2016 counted 119,512 inhabitants in 36,520 households. Nazarabad is a city well-known for growing fruit for Tehran.

References 

Nazarabad County

Cities in Alborz Province

Populated places in Alborz Province

Populated places in Nazarabad County